Onsdagsväninnan is a 1946 Swedish film directed by Sture Lagerwall and Alice O'Fredericks.

The film was based on the play Peter den store by Paul Sarauw, which premiered in 1930 at Det Ny Theater. In 1943 the play was filmed in a Danish version as Hans onsdagsveninde, also directed by O'Fredericks.

Cast
 Erik 'Bullen' Berglund - Larsson
 Sonja Wigert - Karin Larsson
 Gerda Lundequist - Mathilde Hallencreutz
 Sture Lagerwall - Douglas Hallencreutz
 Elof Ahrle - Baltzar Quensel
 Julia Cæsar - Landlady

External links

1946 films
Swedish black-and-white films
Films directed by Alice O'Fredericks
Films directed by Sture Lagerwall
1940s Swedish-language films
Swedish drama films
1946 drama films
1940s Swedish films